Campanile cornucopiae is a species of fossil sea snail, a marine gastropod mollusc in the family Campanilidae. This species lived during the Eocene epoch, from 56 to 33.9 million years ago.

References

External links
 Museum d’histoire naturelle du Havre
 The Fossil Forum

Campanilidae
Eocene gastropods
Paleogene gastropods of Europe
Paleogene gastropods of North America
Fossil taxa described in 1818